Nkiru Nzegwu (born March 22, 1954) is a Nigerian philosopher, painter, author, curator and art historian. She is Distinguished Professor for Research at State University of New York at Binghamton.

Among Dr. Nzegwu’s areas of expertise are African aesthetics, philosophy, African feminist issues, multicultural studies in art, and digital publishing. 

She had managed Onira Arts Africa gallery in Ottawa, Canada, and had been a producer for a very popular radio program, Voice of Nigeria. She has received numerous major research fellowships and grant including the Senior Humanities Fellowship of the Institute for the Study of Gender in Africa at UCLA; The Getty Senior Research Grant; the Cornell University Society For The Humanities Fellowship; SUNY Research Foundation Fellowship and Project Grant; the Smithsonian Institution Postdoctoral Fellowship; University of Ottawa Merit Graduate Scholarship, and the Nigerian Federal Government Scholarship.

She was an associate producers of Nigerian Art - Kindred Spirits (1996), the Emmy award winning Smithsonian documentary. She is a member of a number of professional organizations and often gives talks and workshops on gender issues, art and on publishing. She is on the board of International Consortium for Alternative Academic Publishing [ICAAP].

Main publications 
Rethinking Motherhood: African and Nordic Perspectives. Endicott, NY: Africa Resource Press, 2020 (co-editor, with Signe Arfred)

Onitsha at the Millennium: Legacy, History and Transformation. Endicott, NY: Africa Resource Press, 2013 (editor)

His Majesty Nnaemeka Alfred Ugochukwu Achebe: A Ten-Year Milestone. Endicott, NY: Africa Resource Press, 2013. (editor)

The New African Diaspora. Bloomington, IN: Indiana University Press, 2009. (co-editor, with Isidore Okpewho)

Family Matters: Feminist Concepts in African Philosophy of Culture. Albany, NY: SUNY Pres, 2006.

Contemporary Textures: Multidimensionality in Nigerian Art. Binghamton: ISSA, 1999. (editor)

Issues in Contemporary African Art. Binghamton: International Society for the Study of Africa [ISSA], 1998. (editor)

References

21st-century American philosophers
Living people
1954 births
Philosophy journal editors
Nigerian philosophers
Philosophers of art
Feminist philosophers
Nigerian painters
Nigerian art historians
Nigerian women curators